Get into You is the second album by Australian pop singer Dannii Minogue. It was released by MCA Records on 4 October 1993 in the United Kingdom and a deluxe edition with bonus tracks and remixes was released in 2009.

Background and composition
The album sessions started in 1992, which Minogue discussed on British television in late 1992, whilst promoting her "Love's On Every Corner" single. At that time, there was no album title, as she relays. This album includes the UK Top 40 hit singles "Show You the Way to Go" (which peaked at No. 30), "This Is It" (peaked at No. 10) and "This Is the Way" (peaked at No. 27). It is more mature and soulful than her more poppy debut, Love and Kisses. It features sophisticated music production, considerable downtempo moments, and mature vocals, as well as elements of funk and R&B.

In 2009, it saw a two-disc remaster, featuring B-side, "It's Time to Move On" along with unreleased tracks and remixes.

Track listing

Standard edition

Japanese edition

Deluxe edition (2009)
Remastered edition issued by Palare Records on 7 December 2009, includes the full album plus rare and previously unreleased songs; excluding the b-side, "No Secret" for unknown reasons.

Charts

Formats
These are the formats of major album releases of Get into You:

Get into You: Video Collection
A collection of music videos produced to promote the album's singles was released in the UK on 30 May 1994 by Mushroom UK. The VHS reached number 35 on the UK video chart. It also contained an interview with Minogue and behind-the-scenes footage.

Track listing
 "Love's on Every Corner"
 "Show You the Way to Go"
 "This Is It"
 "This Is the Way"
 "Get into You"
 Interview & Dannii's personal video footage from her travels & live shows

Notes

1993 albums
Dannii Minogue albums
MCA Records albums
Mushroom Records albums